Mario Tomić (born 20 June 1988) is a Croatian handball player. He currently plays for RK Nexe Našice at the position of pivot.

He started his career as a goalkeeper in Medveščak. In 2011 he came to Siscia, where he moved to the position of pivot. Although he played in qualifications for the EHF Cup, due to a financial crisis in the club he went to Qatar. There, he played for 5 years in Al Sadd.

In 2017, he returned to Croatia and three months later signed a contract with RK Nexe Našice. He is still playing for the Qatar national team.

References 

1988 births
Living people
Handball players from Zagreb
Croatian male handball players
RK Medveščak Zagreb players
21st-century Croatian people